Laurence Morgan (5 May 1931 – January 2022) was an English professional footballer, and manager who was active during the 1940s, 1950s and 1960s. He was born in Rotherham on 5 May 1931, and died in January 2022 at the age of 90.

Managerial statistics

Honours

As player-manager 
Darlington
 Fourth Division runner-up: 1965-66

References

External links

1931 births
2022 deaths
Footballers from Rotherham
English footballers
Association football defenders
English Football League players
Huddersfield Town A.F.C. players
Rotherham United F.C. players
Darlington F.C. players
English football managers
English Football League managers
Darlington F.C. managers
Norwich City F.C. managers